Otto Müller (born 21 June 1899, date of death unknown) was a Swiss freestyle wrestler and Olympic medalist. He received a bronze medal at the 1924 Summer Olympics in Paris.

References

External links

1899 births
Wrestlers at the 1924 Summer Olympics
Swiss male sport wrestlers
Olympic bronze medalists for Switzerland
Year of death missing
Olympic medalists in wrestling
Medalists at the 1924 Summer Olympics